Bayt Daras was a Palestinian Arab town located   northeast of Gaza and approximately  above sea level, which was depopulated in 1948.

History
A grave, dating to the Hellenistic era, probably from the first half of the third century BCE, have been found and excavated at the site.

Bayt Daras was an archaeological site that contained stone foundations and vaulted rooms.  The  Crusaders built a castle on the hill that overlooked the village. During the Mamluk rule in Palestine, (1205-1517), Bayt Daras formed part of a mail route from Cairo to Damascus. In this period, in 1325, a khan, or caravanserai, was built in the village.

Ottoman Empire 
In 1517, Bayt Daras was incorporated into the Ottoman Empire with the rest of Palestine, and in 1596 the village appeared in the Ottoman tax registers as being in the nahiya (subdistrict) of Gaza under the Liwa of Gaza, with a population of 58 Muslim households; an estimated 319 persons. It paid a fixed tax rate of 33,3% on a number of crops, including wheat and barley, as well as on goats, beehives and vineyards; a total of 7,900 akçe. 1/24 of the revenue went to a waqf.

In 1838, Beit Daras was noted as a Muslim village in the Gaza district.

French explorer Victor Guérin visited the village in 1863,  and found it to have 700 inhabitants. In the 1882  PEF's Survey of Western Palestine (SWP), the village of Bayt Daras was described as being surrounded by gardens and olive groves, and it was bordered to the north by a pond.

British Mandate 

In the 1922 census of Palestine, conducted by the British Mandate authorities, Bait Daras had a population of 1,670  Muslims, increasing in the  1931 census of Palestine, to 1,804, still all Muslim, in 401 inhabited houses.

In the 1945 statistics  Beit Daras had a population of 2,750 Muslims,  with 16,357  dunams of land, according to an official land and population survey. Of this, 832 dunams were allocated to citrus and banana plants, 472 plantations and irrigable land, 14,436 used for cereals, while 88  dunams were built-up land.

State of Israel 

In response to hundreds of fighters from Bayt Daras attacking Kibbutz Nitzanim, the village was subject to an Israeli counteroffensive military assault four times. It was defended by the Sudanese Army and a number of local militiamen and, according to Ramzy Baroud, subjected to heavy shelling on March 27–28, 1948, in which nine villagers died and much of the crops were destroyed. The objective of the Palmach's operational plan, 'Operation Lightning' (Mivtza Barak) was to compel the Arab inhabitants of the area to 'move' and by striking one or more population centres to cause an exodus, which was foreseen given the wave of panic that was sweeping Arab communities after the Deir Yassin massacre.  Bayt Daras was targeted to be surrounded, to have the villagers surrender and hand over their arms, and if this order was resisted, it was to be mortared, stormed and 'dealt with in the manner of scorched earth'. It was finally captured by military assault on May 11, 1948 by the Givati Brigade during Operation Barak, just prior to the outbreak of the 1948 Arab–Israeli War. The village suffered some 50 casualties, and many houses were then blown up, and wells and granaries sabotaged. Bayt Daras had a population of 3,190 living in 709 houses in 1948. In Baroud's account, a massacre took place as people fled the village.

According to the memoirs of Gamal Abdel Nasser, the empty village was reoccupied by Sudanese forces in June, but they left after a signaling error caused them to be shelled by their own side.

Structures in the village were made of stone foundations with vaulted rooms. There were also two elementary schools and two mosques, all of which were demolished after its capture.

Following the war the area was incorporated into the State of Israel. In 1950 the moshav of  Giv'ati was built on the site of the village, with two other moshavim, Azrikam, Emunim, established on land that had belonged to Bayt Daras. Later in the 1950s a farm called Zemorot was built on Khirbat Awda, which had also belonged to Bayt Daras.

In 1992 the village site was described: "The only remain of village buildings are the foundations of one house and some scattered rubble. The site is overgrown with wild vegetation interspersed by cactuses and eucalyptus trees. At least one of the streets is clearly recognisable. The surrounding fields are cultivated by the settlements."

Culture
A woman's thob (loose fitting robe with sleeves) dated to about 1930 from the village of Beit Daras is part of the Museum of International Folk Art (MOIFA) collection at Santa Fe. The dress fabric is called abu hizz ahmar (black cotton ground with purple, orange and green stipes of cotton and silk), from Majdal. The only embroidery on the front is below the neck opening. The back panel has three horizontal bands of embroidery, and a local version of the khem-el-basha ("the pashas tent") motif along the hem.

See also
Depopulated Palestinian locations in Israel
Abdul Rahman Ahmed Jibril Baroud
Mohammed Assaf

References

Bibliography

 

 

  

Nasser, G.A. (1955/1973):  "Memoirs" in Journal of Palestine Studies    
“Nasser's Memoirs of the First Palestine War” in 2, no. 2 (Win. 73): 3-32, pdf-file, downloadable

 
 

Stillman, Yedida Kalfon (1979):  Palestinian costume and jewelry,  Albuquerque: University of New Mexico Press,   (A catalog of the  Museum of International Folk Art (MOIFA)  at Santa Fe's  collection of Palestinian clothing and jewelry.)

External links
Welcome to Bayt Daras Palestine Remembered
 Bayt Daras,  Zochrot
Survey of Western Palestine, Map 16:   IAA, Wikimedia commons
Dome structure in ‘Azrikam
Bayt Daras from the Khalil Sakakini Cultural Center

Zionist terrorism
District of Gaza
Arab villages depopulated prior to the 1948 Arab–Israeli War